Magnet of Doom ("The Elder Ferchaux"), also known as An Honorable Young Man, is a 1963 French film, directed by Jean-Pierre Melville, based on the novel of the same title by Georges Simenon.

Synopsis
In Paris the young ex-para and would-be boxer, Michel Maudet, loses his first big fight and is sacked by his manager. Needing a job, he answers an ad for a male secretary able to travel and is hired on the spot by Dieudonné Ferchaux, senior partner of a failing bank who has a criminal past. Without telling his girl friend Lina, whom he leaves penniless, that night he flies with Ferchaux to New York. Next morning, Ferchaux is able to collect millions of dollars from his safe-deposit box but cannot touch his US bank account because the French authorities are seeking his extradition. Hiring a car, he and Maudet drive by back roads to Louisiana, shadowed by FBI agents.

Renting an isolated house in New Orleans, Ferchaux falls sick and Maudet gets increasingly frustrated at the whims of an old man with no power left beyond his attaché case of dollars. Going to the neighbourhood bar for drink and company, Maudet mentions his boss's stash to the owner Jeff, a crook and murderer, and then picks up a dancer Lou in a night club. Deciding he would rather be with her, he takes Ferchaux's case of money but something makes him go back with it to the house, where Jeff and an accomplice are trying to rob Ferchaux, who fights back ferociously. Though Maudet routs the villains, Ferchaux has been knifed and dies in his arms. With his last breath he urges Maudet to take his keys, which will open another safe-deposit box full of dollars in Venezuela, but Maudet has had enough.

Production
The outdoor scenes were shot on location in the U.S..  It was Melville's first feature film shot in color and Franscope.

Cast 
 Jean-Paul Belmondo : Michel Maudet
 Charles Vanel : Dieudonné Ferchaux
 Michèle Mercier : Lou, the dancer
 Malvina Silberberg : Lina, the Parisian
 Stefania Sandrelli : Angie, the hitchhiker
 Andrex : M. Andréi
 André Certes : Émile Ferchaux

Release
Magnet of Doom was released in France in 1963.

Reception
John Simon of The New Leader described Magnet of Doom as 'more than usually trashy Simenon turned into a would-be thriller, with Belmondo perpetuating his irresistible, smilingly evil, stereotyped self'.

References

External links 
 
Magnet of Doom at Le Film Guide
Essay on L'aîné des Ferchaux by Rob Nixon at Turner Classic Movies
2011 review essay by James Travers at frenchfilms.org.

French crime drama films
Italian crime drama films
Films directed by Jean-Pierre Melville
Films set in the United States
Films based on Belgian novels
Films based on works by Georges Simenon
Films scored by Georges Delerue
1960s French films
1960s Italian films